UNB (Hangul: 유앤비) was a South Korean boy band formed through the KBS reality show The Unit. The group was composed of nine members: Jun, Euijin, Ko Ho-jung, Feeldog, Marco, Ji Han-sol, Daewon, Kijung, and Chan. Their debut album, Boyhood, was released on April 7, 2018. UNB ended their activities on January 27, 2019.

History

The Unit: Idol Rebooting Project
Prior to The Unit, all the members were actively involved in the entertainment industry: Feeldog debuted in 2012 as a member of Big Star. Euijin joined A.cian in 2014 under the name Lo-J but left the group in 2015 due to problems with the company, later debuting again in 2016 as a member of Bigflo. Daewon debuted as a member of Madtown in 2014 which later disbanded during the show. Ko Hojung debuted as a member of Hotshot in 2014. Jun joined U-KISS as the youngest member in 2014. In 2017, Chan debuted as a member of A.C.E, Kijung as a member of IM, and Marco as a member of Hot Blood Youth. Ji Hansol is a former SM Rookies trainee who left the company in 2017 to sign with J-FLO Entertainment and debuted with Newkidd.

In July 2017, KBS announced their new survival show that would create male and female unit groups, with nine members each, among idols who had already debuted. The program aimed to give them a fair chance to demonstrate their talents that they might not have been able to showcase before. It premiered on October 28, 2017 and concluded on February 10, 2018.

In November 2017, it was announced that the winning group will do promotions for seven months
and if the winning group gained success, their contract will be extended up to twenty-five months. The winning group members had opportunity to participate in other activities with their original agencies.

The tickets sold out within two hours of being on sale.

On February 24's broadcast of The Unit's Special Show, the final nine male contestants that formed "Uni+ B" became UNB following the announcement.

2018–2019: Debut, Boyhood, Black Heart and disbandment 
On April 7, UNB officially made their debut with their extended play titled Boyhood. The EP featured double title tracks, "Feeling" and "Only One". They held their debut stage on You Hee-yeol's Sketchbook.

On June 1, a dance battle video was released, showcasing the chorus of the new song, Black Heart. Over the following days, other clips teasing the song were released as well. On June 11, a mysterious poster was posted online. The poster showed eye close-ups of two men and women, along with the date 28 June 2018 and UNB's logo. It was later revealed to be the release date of the group's second mini-album. Later, on June 18, conceptual photos were released, which revealed the identities of the faces in the poster:
 Jungha (formerly of Beatwin; ranked 30th)
 Hangyul (BAE173; ranked 13th)
 Jueun (DIA)
 Anne (S.I.S; ranked 22nd)

All except for Jueun had participated on The Unit alongside UNB. The photoset's title included the term "Performance feat.", indicating their participation in the album's upcoming promotion cycle.

On June 28, the EP Black Heart was released, along with the music video of the lead track with the same name.

Members
Euijin (의진; Bigflo)
Feeldog (필독; Big Star) — leader
Daewon (대원; former Madtown)
Marco (마르코; Hot Blood Youth)
Ko Ho-jung (고호정; Hotshot)
Ji Han-sol (지한솔; Newkidd)
Jun (준; U-KISS)
Chan (찬; A.C.E)
Kijung (기중; IM)

Discography

Extended plays

Live albums

Singles

Filmography

Reality show
 The Unit (KBS2, 2017–18)
 UNB in Japan: OND (2018)

Awards and nominations

Asian Music Awards

Golden Disc Awards

Soribada Best K-Music Awards

References

K-pop music groups
MBK Entertainment artists
2018 establishments in South Korea
Musical groups established in 2018
Musical groups from Seoul
South Korean boy bands
South Korean dance music groups
South Korean pop music groups